Russell or Russ Brown may refer to:

Entertainment
 Russ Brown (actor) (1892–1964), American actor
 Russell Brown (author), Australian author
 Russell Brown (Fair City character), character in soap opera Fair City
 L. Russell Brown (born 1940), American lyricist
 Russell Brown (director), American filmmaker

Politics
 Russell Brown (British politician) (born 1951), Scottish Labour Party politician
 Russell Brown (Canadian politician) (1911–1971), politician in Saskatchewan, Canada
 Russell P. Brown (1891–1965), American banker and member of the Massachusetts House of Representatives

Other
 Russell A. Brown (born 1952), American physician and computer scientist
 Russell Brown (judge) (born 1965), Canadian jurist named to the Supreme Court of Canada
 Russell Brown (media commentator) (born 1962), New Zealand media commentator
 Russell Wolf Brown (born 1985), American middle-distance runner

See also
 Russel Brown (1900–1988), Anglican bishop in Canada